Girardinus metallicus is a species of fish from the family of the Poeciliidae.

Morphology
The male can have a size of 5 cm and the female can reach 9 cm in size.

Geographical distribution
The species is endemic to the island of Cuba.

References

External links
 Catalogue of Life 
 The Taxonomicon

metallicus
Tropical fish
Taxa named by Felipe Poey
Fish described in 1854
Freshwater fish of Cuba
Poeciliidae
Endemic fauna of Cuba